Jackson Township is one of the twelve townships of Paulding County, Ohio, United States.  The 2000 census found 1,886 people in the township, 847 of whom lived in the unincorporated portions of the township.

Geography
Located in the central part of the county, it borders the following townships:
Emerald Township - north
Auglaize Township - northeast
Brown Township - east
Washington Township - southeast corner
Latty Township - south
Blue Creek Township - southwest corner
Paulding Township - west
Crane Township - northwest corner

Two villages are located in Jackson Township: a slight portion of Paulding, the county seat and largest village of Paulding County, in the northwest; and Broughton in the southwest.

It is one of two county townships (the other being Paulding Township) without a border on any other county.

Name and history
It is one of thirty-seven Jackson Townships statewide.

Government
The township is governed by a three-member board of trustees, who are elected in November of odd-numbered years to a four-year term beginning on the following January 1. Two are elected in the year after the presidential election and one is elected in the year before it. There is also an elected township fiscal officer, who serves a four-year term beginning on April 1 of the year after the election, which is held in November of the year before the presidential election. Vacancies in the fiscal officership or on the board of trustees are filled by the remaining trustees.

References

External links
County website

Townships in Paulding County, Ohio
Townships in Ohio